The fan-tailed widowbird (Euplectes axillaris), also known as the red-shouldered widowbird, is a species of bird in the family Ploceidae, which is native to grassy and swampy areas of the tropical and subtropical Afrotropics.

Range
It is found in Angola, Botswana, Burundi, Cameroon, Central African Republic, Chad, Republic of the Congo, DRC, Eswatini, Ethiopia, Kenya, Lesotho, Malawi, Mali, Mozambique, Namibia, Niger, Nigeria, Rwanda, Somalia, South Africa, Sudan, Tanzania, Uganda, Zambia, and Zimbabwe.

Races
There are five accepted races:
 E. a. subsp. bocagei (Sharpe, 1871) – West Africa from Mali to CAR and DRC, and southwards to the Caprivi Strip, Okavango and upper Zambezi regions.
 E. a. subsp. phoeniceus (Heuglin, 1862) – East Africa (Sudan to upland Kenya, Tanzania, Zambia and Malawi)
 E. a. subsp. traversii (Salvadori, 1888) – Ethiopian Highlands
 E. a. subsp. zanzibaricus (Shelley, 1881) – African east coast (Somalia to Tanzania)
 E. a. subsp. axillaris (A.Smith, 1838) – southeastern Africa (lowland Malawi to eastern South Africa)

References

External links
 (Fan-tailed widowbird = ) Red-shouldered widowbird - Species text in The Atlas of Southern African Birds
 Species text on Weaver Watch

fan-tailed widowbird
Birds of Sub-Saharan Africa
fan-tailed widowbird
Taxonomy articles created by Polbot